The Elenska Basilica or Elensko Basilica (Elenska bazilika) is a large partially preserved late Roman (early Byzantine) Christian basilica in west central Bulgaria. The initially domeless basilica, which features thick walls and defensive towers, had a dome added in the mid-6th century, during the reign of Justinian I. The church was ruined in the early 18th century, during the Ottoman rule of Bulgaria.

Architecture

Archaeologists have clearly distinguished two separate building periods based on the basilica's ruins. The Elenska Basilica's middle and western sections are older and constructed out of brick and crushed stones, whereas the more recent eastern section was built out of homogeneous bricks with thick grouts joined using red mortar. It featured a large apse in the centre, flanked by two smaller apses. The middle nave was divided into two squares by four identical columns. The narthex, which lay in the church's western section, accommodated a diaconicon and a prothesis. A baptisterium was located in the church's southern section. Four rectangular defensive towers were located in each corner of the wall.

History
The Elensko area where the church is located (and which was the basis for its name) was known to have been inhabited in antiquity by a Thracian tribe, who around the 6th–5th century BC joined the Bessi state. Thracologist Alexander Fol links the area's name (which he derives from the Bulgarian word елен elen, "deer") to an ancient legend about a deer who would descend from the Balkan Mountains on the same day every year to be ritually sacrificed by the natives. Indeed, plenty of deer remains have been unearthed in the vicinity of the basilica. Another theory derives the name of the area from the Bulgarianized name of the Greeks, елини elini ("Hellenes"), explained by the church's construction in the early Byzantine period.

The Elenska Basilica was in active use during the Second Bulgarian Empire (11th–14th century) as a literary centre and an Eastern Orthodox monastery. A 13th-century literary work in Middle Bulgarian, the Pirdop Acts of the Apostles, may have been authored there, as a legend says it was discovered in the church's ruins in the 19th century. It remained in use until around 1700, when the local Ottoman forces under Yahya Pasha are thought to have purposefully destroyed it during a military campaign. The Ottomans reportedly bombarded the church with cannons and set it ablaze because they regarded the monks as rebellious.

The earliest archaeological research on the Elenska Basilica dates to the 1890s, when local teachers explored the ruins. Archaeologist Petar Mutafchiev conducted excavations in 1913 and published his findings in the article The Elenska Basilica in the vicinity of Pirdop. The church has only been slightly reconstructed since then. The basilica's ruins are in a satisfactory and stable condition, though the surrounding defensive wall has been mostly destroyed.

References

5th-century churches
6th-century churches
Churches in Bulgaria
Ruins in Bulgaria
Buildings and structures in Sofia Province